Alexandra Feigin (born 22 December 2002) is a Bulgarian figure skater. She is a two-time Sofia Trophy champion (2019, 2020), the 2019 Denkova-Staviski Cup champion, the 2018 Crystal Skate of Romania champion, and a five-time Bulgarian national champion (2016, 2018–2020, 2022).

Career

Early years 
Feigin started learning to skate in 2009. She began appearing internationally for Bulgaria in 2010. From November 2013 through February 2016, she competed in the advanced novice ranks.

Her ISU Junior Grand Prix (JGP) debut came in August 2016. In March, she competed at the 2017 World Junior Championships in Taipei, Taiwan. She was ranked 25th in the short program and missed the cutoff for the free skate.

Feigin qualified to the final segment at the 2018 World Junior Championships in Sofia, Bulgaria; she finished fifteenth overall after placing seventeenth in the short program and fifteenth in the free skate.

2018–2019 season 
Feigin began her season on the JGP series, placing eleventh in Slovakia and eighth in Canada. Making her senior international debut, she won gold at the Crystal Skate of Romania in October and at the Denkova-Staviski Cup in November.

Feigin made her debut at a senior ISU championship at the 2019 European Championships, where she placed eleventh.  She placed twenty-second at the 2019 World Junior Championships and then made her senior World Championship debut in Saitama, where she placed seventeenth.

2019–2020 season 
Feigin competed and won medals in several minor senior international events and placed fourth at the 2019 CS Nebelhorn Trophy, narrowly missing the podium.  She was seventeenth at the 2020 European Championships. She had been assigned to compete at the World Championships in Montreal, but those were cancelled as a result of the coronavirus pandemic.

2020–2021 season 
With the pandemic continuing to limit international travel, Feigin competed at a European-only 2020 CS Budapest Trophy, winning the bronze medal, her first on the Challenger series.  After winning the Bulgarian national title again, she placed fourth at the 2021 Tallink Hotels Cup. Feigin placed seventeenth at the 2021 World Championships in Stockholm. This result qualified a ladies' berth for Bulgaria at the 2022 Winter Olympics.

2021–2022 season 
In her only event of the fall season, Feigin finished in fifth at the 2021 CS Denis Ten Memorial Challenge before coming twentieth at the 2022 European Championships to start the new year. 

Named to the Bulgarian team for the 2022 Winter Olympics, Feigin placed twenty-third in the short program of the women's event, qualifying for the free skate. She dropped one place in the free skate, finishing twenty-fourth. Feigin was twenty-eighth at the 2022 World Championships to end the season.

Programs

Competitive highlights 
CS: Challenger Series; JGP: Junior Grand Prix

Detailed results 
Small medals for short and free programs awarded only at ISU Championships.

Senior results

Junior results

References

External links 
 

2002 births
Living people
Bulgarian female single skaters
Israeli
Israeli emigrants to Bulgaria
Figure skaters from Sofia
Figure skaters at the 2022 Winter Olympics
Olympic figure skaters of Bulgaria
Competitors at the 2023 Winter World University Games
21st-century Bulgarian women